Gloster is an unincorporated community and census-designated place (CDP) in DeSoto Parish, Louisiana, United States. As of the 2010 census it had a population of 94.

It is the nearest community to three places listed on the U.S. National Register of Historic Places:  
Myrtle Hill Plantation House
Roseneath
Thomas Scott House

Demographics

References

Populated places in Ark-La-Tex
Census-designated places in DeSoto Parish, Louisiana
Census-designated places in Louisiana
Census-designated places in Shreveport – Bossier City metropolitan area